Junas Naciri (born 18 June 1973) is a Dutch retired footballer who played as a midfielder.

Football career
Naciri was born in Diemen, North Holland. After unsuccessfully emerging through AFC Ajax's youth system, he played for Telstar and HFC Haarlem in the Dutch second division, with a spell in Spain in between with lowly CD Lugo.

In 2000, Naciri moved to Portugal, starting with third level's C.F. União. His solid performances attracted the attention of Rio Ave F.C. in the Primeira Liga, where he would be regularly used during two seasons (34 starts), with the Vila do Conde club always retaining its status.

After one year with Moreirense FC (division two), Naciri moved to Cyprus and spent two campaigns in the First Division with Enosis Neon Paralimni FC, after which he returned to Portugal at the age of 35, with União Desportiva Lavrense in the second regional league of Porto.

External links
Stats at Voetbal International 

1973 births
Living people
People from Diemen
Dutch footballers
Association football midfielders
Eerste Divisie players
SC Telstar players
HFC Haarlem players
Segunda División players
Segunda División B players
CD Lugo players
Primeira Liga players
Liga Portugal 2 players
Segunda Divisão players
C.F. União players
Rio Ave F.C. players
Moreirense F.C. players
Cypriot First Division players
Enosis Neon Paralimni FC players
Dutch expatriate footballers
Expatriate footballers in Spain
Expatriate footballers in Portugal
Expatriate footballers in Cyprus
Dutch expatriate sportspeople in Spain
Dutch expatriate sportspeople in Portugal
Dutch expatriate sportspeople in Cyprus
Footballers from North Holland